Arthur John Priest (31 August 1887 – 11 February 1937) was an English fireman and stoker who was notable for surviving four ship sinkings, including the , HMS Alcantara, HMHS Britannic and the . Due to these incidents, Priest gained the moniker "the unsinkable stoker".

Life
Priest was the son of Harry Priest, a labourer and his wife Elizabeth Garner, and was one of twelve children. In 1915, Priest married Annie Martin (née Hampton) in Birkenhead and had three sons; called Arthur John, George and Frederick Harry. The family lived for a number of years at 17 Briton Street, Southampton.

Priest worked as a stoker, in the bowels of steam-powered ships. He was considered a part of the black gang, in a group of 27 men, which consisted of six firemen, two trimmers, and the firemen's steward colloquially known as a 'peggy' whose task was to bring food and refreshments to the group. The work was intense and often done while stripped to the waist due to the sustained and intense heat of the furnaces. Two other survivors of the Titanic, Archie Jewell and Violet Jessop, would later also survive the sinking of the Britannic with Priest, with Jewell later being killed on the Donegal. In 1917, Priest was awarded the Mercantile Marine Ribbon for his service in the Great War.

After the sinking of SS Donegal, Priest retired from working at sea and left his job as a stoker. He lived out the rest of his days in Southampton, with his wife Annie. He claimed that "no one wished to sail with him after these disasters." 

Other than his survival stories, there is little information about his personal life. According to sources, he died in 1937 at his home in Southampton at the age of 49 from pneumonia with his wife Annie by his side. He is buried at Hollybrook Cemetery in Southampton, England. He was given the nickname "the unsinkable stoker" because of his stories of survival at sea.

References

External links
  Titanic’s Unsinkable Survivors The Old Salt Blog. The Arthur John Priest & Violet Jessop
 The man who survived 3 sinkings in the First World War and the Titanic February 29, 2016
 Amazing Street Arts That'll Blow your Mind  Street Arts, Amazing "To the Bitter End," December 2019
 The Old Reliable, RMS Olympic Nov, 15, 2017
 The wreck Site, RMS Alcantara (+1916) Allen Toney, 2006  
 Titanic's unsinkable stoker Peter Engberg-Klarström, Brian Ticehurst, Bill Wormstedt, "Mr. Arthur John Priest" 2017  
 Forgotten Wrecks of the First World War  Beresford, Katherine.  Maritime Archaeology Trust.  22 November 2017

1887 births
1937 deaths
19th-century English people
20th-century English people
People from Southampton
RMS Titanic survivors
Burials at Hollybrook Cemetery
Deaths from pneumonia in England